Jastrzębnik may refer to:

Jastrzębnik, Lubusz Voivodeship, Poland
Jastrzębnik, Masovian Voivodeship, Poland